Enshi is a county-level city in and the seat of Enshi Tujia and Miao Autonomous Prefecture, in western Hubei province, People's Republic of China. The prefecture's legislature, executive and judiciary are seated here, as well as its CPC and Public security bureau.

History

The oldest records of Enshi date the Spring and Autumn Period of 776BC. At that time the area was a state known as Bazi, which lasted until 476BC.  Enshi then became a county from 475 to 221, prior to it being absorbed into the Chinese Dynasties during the Qi period.  In 1925, the city of Enshi formed the Exi Tujia and Miao Autonomous Prefecture, which in 1935 became the Enshi Tujia and Miao Autonomous Prefecture.

Administrative divisions

Three subdistricts:
Wuyangba Subdistrict, Liujiaoting Subdistrict, Xiaoduchuan Subdistrict

Five towns:
Longfeng, Cuiba, Banqiao, Baiyangping (before 2013 Baiyangping Township ), Sancha (former Sancha Township )

Eight townships:
Xintang Township, Hongtu Township, Shadi Township, Taiyanghe Township, Tunbao Township, Baiguo Township, Bajiao Dong Ethnic Township, Shengjiaba Township

Other area:
Mufu

Tourism

The city is built alongside the Qing River and is surrounded by forest-covered mountains. The city has many hotels, restaurants and spas. Restaurants here in general cater for Chinese tastes; however there is one western style restaurant called "Mac Home" in the city center. The food in Enshi is spicy and includes many "Hot Pot" style dishes as well as smoked pork and chirzo style sausage meat, spicy fried potatoes and lamb skewers.

There is a beautiful Forest Park in Enshi which offers splendid scenery and views of the city as well as an amusement park. there is an out-door cafe in the park with hammocks which sells fresh ground coffee. During the summer months there is white water rafting tours available on the river.

The City Center has a shopping district catering for most tastes. There is a local night club located under the "shelter bridge" called the "Soho Times".

Economy

According to Chinese Agency Enshi's economy depends on its people who almost all are workers call (人民) in Traditional Chinese Language.Statistics show in 2018 July city was known by many chinese businessmen because of its scenery and upcoming demands.In that era of time the city has developed most of its parts and is visiting point for people in Hubei and nearby counties.In the Enshi City there is a university (湖北民族大学）where various departments are taught and Researchers time by time visit its laboratories to find clue.

Climate
Enshi has a monsoon-influenced humid subtropical climate (Köppen Cfa), with short, cool winters, hot, humid summers, and high humidity year-round. More than two-thirds of the annual precipitation of  occurs from May to September. With monthly percent possible sunshine ranging from 12% in January to 50% in August, the city receives only 1,212 hours of bright sunshine annually; winter is especially overcast while July thru September is the sunniest period of the year.

Transportation 
 Enshi Xujiaping Airport
 Yiwan Railway
 China National Highway 209
 G50 Shanghai–Chongqing Expressway, which crosses the Qing River near the city over the Qingjiang Bridge.

References

External links
Official website of Enshi government

Cities in Hubei
County-level divisions of Hubei
Enshi Tujia and Miao Autonomous Prefecture